Falafel is a 2006 Lebanese film written and directed by Michel Kammoun. It world premiered on September 16, 2006 at the Ayam Beirut Festival. Falafel is Kammoun's first feature film, and was produced by Elle Kensington.

Synopsis
A summer evening in Beirut. The life of Toufic, a young Lebanese man, and his nightly strolls. Between his family, friends and love affairs, he tries to seize every day of his life, through pleasures and entertainment. For him, every second is the most important. Soon he discovers that having a normal life, in this country, is a luxury. 15 years after the war had ended, a volcano is lying dormant on every street corner, like a time-ticking bomb that is ready explode… This night will be pivotal in the life of the young man.

Cast
 Elie Mitri (Toufic)
 Gabrielle Bou Rached (Yasmin)
 Said Serhan
 Issam Bou Khaled (Abboudi)
 Michel El Hourany (Nino)
 Aouni Kawas (Jo)
 Hiam Abou Chedid
 Rafic Ali Ahmad
 Roger Assaf
 Fadi Abi Samra
 Maryann Capasso
 Nate Lord
 Gregory Funaro (Niru Meeting)
 Joanna Grigas
 Darren Greaney (the Green Machine)
 Christian Velud (himself)

Reception
Deborah Young of Variety called it "An easy intro to new Lebanese cinema... chronicling the country's post-civil war emptiness with a light touch as it zaps between playful clowning and edge-of-violence darkness."

 Reviews 
 Cinebel (Belgium)
 Euromedcafe
 Filmstart (Germany) 
 Flickfilosopher (USA)
 Kino-zeit (Germany)
 Le Monde (France)
 Les Inrocks (France)
 Liberation (France)
 Mulderville (France) 
 NewYorkCool (USA) 
 Screen International (UK)
 
 The Australian (Australia)

Awards
 Golden Bayard for Best Film, Festival International du Film Francophone de Namur, Belgique 2006
 Golden Bayard for Best Music, Festival International du Film Francophone de Namur, Belgique 2006
 Silver Muhr for Best Film, Dubai International Film Festival, UAE 2007
 Audience Award - LILLE International Film Festival, France 2007.
 Best First Film Award - ROTTERDAM Arab Film Festival, Nederland 2007.
 ART AWARD (Best First Film Award) - ALEXANDRIA International Film Festival, Egypt 2007.
 Bronze Dagger for Best Film, Muscat International Film Festival, Oman 2008
 Special Jury Prize, International First Film Festival Annonay, France 2008.
 Palmera de Bronce, Mostra de Valencia "Cinema del Mediterrani", Spain 2007

References

External links
 Official site
 Michel Kammoun's Official site
 
 Trailer of the movie

2006 films
2006 drama films
2000s Arabic-language films
Lebanese drama films